Engin Atsür (born April 2, 1984) is a Turkish professional basketball player for Orlandina Basket of the Lega Basket Serie A (LBA). Atsür played college basketball at the North Carolina State University from 2003 to 2007.

He has also German citizenship by his mother.

Early years
Atsür attended Saint-Benoit French High School in Istanbul. He started playing basketball in the youth teams of Efes Pilsen S.K.

After one year in the Turkish Second League, Atsür moved to Raleigh, North Carolina, U.S. to study business administration at NC State on an athletic scholarship and he graduated in 2007. Atsür was the starting point guard for NC State all four years. He was named to the Collegeinsider.com Defensive All-America Team for his junior season.

Pro career
Atsür signed his first professional contract with the Italian League team Benetton Treviso on June 30, 2007. After spending one season in Italy, he signed a contract with the Turkish League team Efes Pilsen. For the 2009–10 season, Atsür signed a contract with Beşiktaş Cola Turka.

After a successful season with Beşiktaş Cola Turka (27 games in TBL with 30.0 min, 13.1 pts, 48.3% FG, 40.8% 3P, 80.2% FT, 3.0 reb, 4.4 ast, 1.4 stl, 2.4 TO), Atsür signed with Fenerbahçe for two years.

On June 29, 2012, he signed a two-year contract with Galatasaray Medical Park. On June, 2013, Atsur's Galatasaray won the league championship after defeating Banvit B.K. in the TBL finals.

On June 23, 2014, Atsür returned to his former team Beşiktaş, when he signed a 2-year deal with an option for a third year.

On July 14, 2016, Atsür signed with German club Alba Berlin.

On September 5, 2017, he signed with Italian club Orlandina Basket.

Turkish national team
At the 2002 European Championship for Junior Men at Germany, Atsür averaged 22.3 PPG and he was selected to the All-Tournament First Team as the best shooting guard of the competition.

Atsür was also a member of the senior Turkish national team, and figured in Turkey's squad that finished sixth in the 2006 FIBA World Championship held in Japan.

Milestones
At North Carolina State:	
 33rd player in North Carolina State University history to score over 1,000 points; scored 1181 points in his career.	
 2nd best three-point shooter in school history	
 4th best in minutes played in school history (3,838 min- 119 games- 32,3 mpg)	
 Averaged 9.9 PPG over his career

References

External links
 Atsür's Bio At Gopack.com
 TurkSports.Net Profile
 Draftexpress.com Profile
 Atsur Article
 TBLStat.net Profile

1984 births
Living people
Alba Berlin players
Anadolu Efes S.K. players
Beşiktaş men's basketball players
Competitors at the 2009 Mediterranean Games
Fenerbahçe men's basketball players
Galatasaray S.K. (men's basketball) players
Mediterranean Games bronze medalists for Turkey
NC State Wolfpack men's basketball players
Orlandina Basket players
Pallacanestro Treviso players
Basketball players from Istanbul
Turkish men's basketball players
Turkish expatriate basketball people in the United States
Turkish expatriate basketball people in Italy
Turkish people of German descent
German people of Turkish descent
2006 FIBA World Championship players
Mediterranean Games medalists in basketball
Point guards